Anthony Devonne Waters (born July 25, 1985) is a former American football linebacker. He was drafted by the San Diego Chargers in the third round of the 2007 NFL Draft. He played college football at Clemson. He is also the older brother of Indianapolis Colts linebacker Shaquille Leonard.

College career
Waters attended Clemson University for college. Waters' senior season ended early as he tore his ACL in his left knee September 3, 2006 in the opening game of the season against Florida Atlantic.

Professional career

San Diego Chargers
Waters was drafted by the San Diego Chargers in the third round (95th overall) of the 2007 NFL Draft. After missing his entire rookie season in 2007, Waters appeared in seven games for the Chargers in 2008 and recorded three tackles. He was waived by the team on February 26, 2009.

New Orleans Saints
Waters signed with the New Orleans Saints on April 15, 2009. He was part of the Saints' final cuts in early September.

Buffalo Bills
Waters signed as a practice squad member of the Buffalo Bills on October 14, 2009.

New Orleans Saints (2nd time)
After spending eight weeks on the Bills' practice squad, Waters returned to the Saints when they signed him to their active roster on December 9, 2009. He was not re-signed following the 2010 season and became a free agent.

NFL statistics

Coaching career
Waters was the linebackers coach for Harding University High School football team from 2013-2015
Recently, Waters has signed on as the head football coach at Grier Middle School in Gastonia, North Carolina.

References

External links
Clemson Tigers bio
New Orleans Saints bio
San Diego Chargers bio

1984 births
Living people
People from Dillon, South Carolina
American football linebackers
Clemson Tigers football players
San Diego Chargers players
New Orleans Saints players
Buffalo Bills players
Players of American football from South Carolina